Guillermo Weller (4 May 1913 – 4 June 1999) was an Argentine racewalker. He competed in the men's 50 kilometres walk at the 1952 Summer Olympics and the 1960 Summer Olympics.

References

1913 births
1999 deaths
Athletes (track and field) at the 1952 Summer Olympics
Athletes (track and field) at the 1960 Summer Olympics
Argentine male racewalkers
Olympic athletes of Argentina
Place of birth missing